Mohsin Ali (born 1 June 1996), is a Pakistani international footballer who plays as a left-back for WAPDA.

Club career

Pakistan Navy
Ali started his career with Pakistan Navy, making his debut against Khan Research Laboratories in 2014 National Football Challenge Cup in a 1–1 draw. His second appearance was against Pakistan Airlines, which they lost 2–1.

International career
Ali made his senior international debut in a friendly 3–1 away loss to Lebanon. He came on as a 77th-minute substitute for Ahsan Ullah. Ali played in 2018 SAFF Championship, his first match was against Nepal in group-stage, which Pakistan won 1–2. In his second group-stage match against Bangladesh, he was booked in the 81st minute as Pakistan lost the match 1–0. His final group-stage appearance was a 3–0 win over Bhutan. Ali started for Pakistan in the semi-finals against India, where he was sent-off in the 86th minute along with Indian midfielder Lallianzuala Chhangte after a brawl broke down between the two players as India defeated Pakistan 3–1.

International statistics

References

External links
 

1996 births
Living people
Pakistani footballers
Pakistan international footballers
Association football defenders
Footballers at the 2014 Asian Games
Footballers at the 2018 Asian Games
Asian Games competitors for Pakistan